Jorge Juan Pelegrina Linares (born 23 April 1984) is a Spanish footballer who plays for UD Ibiza as a defender.

Club career
Born in Adra, Andalusia, Pelegrina made his senior debuts with local AD Adra in the 2003–04 season. After a year with Real Valladolid B, he signed with UD Almería in 2005 summer, being initially assigned with the reserves in the Tercera División. On 11 June 2006 Pelegrina made his professional debut with the main squad, starting in a 3–1 home win over UE Lleida in the Segunda División.

In the following years Pelegrina competed in the Segunda División B, representing Águilas CF (on loan), Pontevedra CF, CD Puertollano, La Roda CF, San Fernando CD and UD Socuéllamos.

References

External links

1984 births
Living people
Spanish footballers
Footballers from Andalusia
Association football defenders
Segunda División players
Segunda División B players
Tercera División players
Real Valladolid Promesas players
UD Almería B players
UD Almería players
Pontevedra CF footballers
CD Puertollano footballers
La Roda CF players